Alice International Airport  is three miles southeast of Alice, in Jim Wells County, Texas. The airport is owned by the city and county. The National Plan of Integrated Airport Systems for 2011–2015 categorized it as a general aviation facility.

From 1950-1951 Trans-Texas operated Douglas DC-3's from Alice Int.

Facilities
Alice International Airport covers 556 acres (225 ha) at an elevation of 178 feet (54 m). It has two runways made of asphalt: 13/31 is 5,997 by 100 feet (1,828 x 30 m) and 17/35 is 4,490 by 100 feet (1,369 x 30 m).

In the year ending March 5, 2011 the airport had 8,610 aircraft operations, average 23 per day: 77% general aviation, 23% military, and <1% air taxi. Seven aircraft were then based at this airport: six single-engine and one helicopter.

References

External links 
  at Texas DOT airport directory
 KALI Aviation, the fixed-base operator (FBO)
 Aerial image as of January 1995 from USGS The National Map
 

Airports in Texas
Alice, Texas
Transportation in Jim Wells County, Texas
Buildings and structures in Jim Wells County, Texas